Bishop Pearson may refer to:
 Carlton Pearson, an American Christian minister (born 1953)
 John Pearson (bishop), an English theologian and scholar (1613 – 1686)